Everything's Rosie is an animated children’s TV series. The series was developed by Vickie Corner for V&S Entertainment Ltd. for CBeebies and Baraem (Series 1-2) and produced in HD CGI animation. The series follows the adventures of a little girl named Rosie and her friends. Four series have been aired along with a special episode "When You Wish Upon an Oak". Everything’s Rosie is broadcast on CBeebies in the UK and internationally across 160 territories.

Plot

Rosie, the protagonist, is a ragdoll-like child who has educational adventures. She and her friends including a young girl, a blue rabbit, a bear, trees, and a bird teach viewers simple lessons as they play and learn while also getting into various adventures in a colourful 3-D animated world.

Episodes

Characters

Main 

Rosie is the lead character, a girl with ribbons for hair as well as a button at the top of her head. She is voiced by Harriet Moran in seasons 1–3 and Joanna Ruiz in Season 4.
Raggles is a blue rabbit. He is voiced by Emma Tate.
Holly is a sweet, polite little girl who has blonde hair and a pink dress as well as a purple bow with small yellow polka dots. She is voiced by Teresa Gallagher.
Will is an impulsive, active boy who has ginger hair, a red shirt & a pair of jeans; he likes riding his Go Speeder and playing with his football. He is voiced by Lewis MacLeod.
Big Bear is a large teddy bear who loves to cook, build & explore with the other friends. He is voiced by Wayne Forester.
Bluebird is a cute yet annoying bird who believes she has magical powers. She is voiced by Emma Tate.
Oakley is an ancient talking oak tree who sits on a hill near Rosie's house. Oakley is where Bluebird's nest is located, and where the Little Acorns live. He is voiced by Wayne Forester.

Other 
Archie is a cute, friendly talking chameleon who can become invisible instead of changing colour. Archie has an appetite for adventure, his common catchphrase is "Ay, caramba" and he is capable of speaking Spanish.
The Little Acorns are a high-pitched giggling trio of acorns who live on one of Oakley's branches.
Little Bear is Big Bear's nephew who occasionally comes to visit his uncle. 
Saffie is a Cedar of Lebanon and sits in a dip beside The Studio. 
Teal is a Northern duck. She likes to point out things that are involved in her sentence.
Manny is a cheeky, mischievous and stubborn bird. He has a croaky voice.
The Mordys are a family of dormice. They have one son and one daughter.
The Dartys are well spoken anthropomorphic geckos with high standards and an aloof air. 
Mat and Nat are two beavers who have set up home at the Beaver Dam near the waterfall. 
Monty is a cheeky monkey who lives in the branches of the Grand Old Oak in the middle of the magical forest. He wears blue dungarees.
The Grand Old Oak is an oak tree who is surrounded by a ring of cool water in the middle of a forest.

Development 
Everything's Rosie was created by Vickie Corner for V&S Entertainment Ltd and co-produced with JCC, owned by The Qatar Foundation. The series was one of the first international co-productions to air on Baraem TV, which is available throughout the Arabic countries and Europe in the Arabic language.

In development for nearly 10 years since 2001/2002 before going into production, the concept was to create a visually appealing girl-led show that would additionally appeal to boys.

Release 
On 3 May 2010, the first episode of Everything’s Rosie aired on CBeebies.  Series 1 introduced the primary characters within Rosie's World and established the relationships between the friends.  Production on Series 2 was completed in 2011 with the first episode airing on 23 May 2011.  Series 2 introduced a range of new secondary characters and additional locations.  The first episode of Series 3 aired on 18 June 2012.  A 24-minute feature length Special "When You Wish Upon an Oak" was commissioned by CBeebies in 2013 and premiered on New Year's Day 2014.  Series 4 completed the production at the end of 2015, with the first episode having aired on 2 March 2015, bringing the total number of episodes to 104.

Everything's Rosie has been sold in over 160 territories worldwide and dubbed into 27 different languages.

Merchandising 
The first line of Everything's Rosie toys was released in 2011. DVDs were launched in conjunction with Universal Studios Home Entertainment in 2012.

Plushes of Rosie, Raggles & Holly were made. However, none of the other characters were made into toys.

Foreign adaptations
Everything's Rosie has been produced in 27 languages worldwide.

Website now available in Serbian

References

External links 

 
 

British children's animated adventure television series
BBC children's television shows
2010 British television series debuts
2015 British television series endings
2010s British children's television series
2010s British animated television series
British computer-animated television series
British preschool education television series
English-language television shows
CBeebies
Animated preschool education television series
2010s preschool education television series
Animated television series about children